Tseng Chun-hsin won the boys' singles tennis title at the 2018 French Open, defeating Sebastián Báez in the final, 7–6(7–5), 6–2.

Alexei Popyrin was the defending champion, but is no longer eligible to participate in junior tournaments.

Seeds

Draw

Finals

Top half

Section 1

Section 2

Bottom half

Section 3

Section 4

Qualifying

Seeds

Qualifiers

Draw

First qualifier

Second qualifier

Third qualifier

Fourth qualifier

Fifth qualifier

Sixth qualifier

Seventh qualifier

Eighth qualifier

External links 
 Draw

Boys' Singles
2018